Alexis is a given name of Greek origin. It is derived from several saints venerated by the Eastern Orthodox and Roman Catholic churches, including Saint Alexius of Rome. Like the name Alexander, Alexis derives from the Greek verb ἀλέξειν (aléxein; 'defender'). The ending "-is" points at its belonging to the masculine gender (according to Greek grammar); however, many women have this name. The Russian equivalent of the name is Alexey or Alexei. Many European languages, including Greek, use the female variant Alexia. 

While the name is mostly male, it has been predominantly given to females in the United States since at least the 1940s, when actress Alexis Smith began appearing in films. It has been among the top 50 most popular names for girls in the United States since 1990. In the 2008 book 5-Star Baby Name Advisor, author Bruce Lansky writes that the girls' name has the image of a "sexy and seductive knockout." The increase in popularity of the name is sometimes attributed to the notable character Alexis Colby from the American television series Dynasty. A 1978 film, Ice Castles, featured as the main character a blind figure skater named Alexis "Lexie" Winston.

Aleksi, a Finnish variant, was the third most popular name for boys born in Finland in 2007. Alessia, an Italian feminine variant, was the second most common name for girls born in Italy in 2006. Alesia, a feminine variant, and Aleksio, a masculine variant, are currently popular names for boys and girls in Albania.

Masculine variants 
 Aleksi, Aleksis (Finnish)
 Aleksis (Latvian)
 Aleix (Catalan)
 Aleixo (Galician), (Portuguese)
 Alejo (Spanish)
 Алексей (Alexei, Alexey, Aleksei, Aleksey), Алексий (Alexiy), Алёша (Alyosha), Лёша (Lyosha) (Russian)
 Алекси, Aleksi (Bulgarian)
 ალექსი, Aleksi (Georgian)
 Aleks (Albanian)
 Aleksije, Aleksej (Serbian), (Croatian)
 Aleksy (Polish)
 Aleš (Czech), (Slovene)
 Alessio (Italian)
 Alexis (Spanish), (English), (French)
 Αλέξιος (Alexios), Αλέξης (Alexis) (Greek)
 Alexius (Latin)
 Elek (Hungarian)
 Lex (English)
  Олексій (Oleksii, Oleksiy),  Олекса (Oleksa) (Ukrainian)

Feminine variants 
 Aleja (Spanish)
 Alesia (Albanian)
 Aleksa (Polish)
 Alexa (English)
 Alexia (English), (Galician), (German), (Greek), (Spanish), (French)
 Алекса (Aleksa, Alexa) (Russian)
 Aléxia (Portuguese)
 Alexina (English)
 Alexis (English)
 Elexis (English)
 Lexa (English)
 Lexia (English)
 Lexi (English)
 Lexie (English)
 Lexis (English)
 Lexus (English)
 Lexy (English)

People 
 Alexis Agrafiotis (born 1970), German-Greek composer, conductor and pianist
 Alexis Akrithakis (1939-1994), Greek artist
 Alexis Alexandris (born 1968), Greek footballer
 Alexis Alexiou (born 1963), Greek footballer
 Alexis Alexopoulos (born 1971), Greek sprinter
 Alexis Alexoudis (born 1972), Greek footballer
 Alexis Apostolopoulos (born 1991), Greek footballer
 Alexis Argüello (1952–2009), Nicaraguan boxer and politician
 Alexis Arquette (1969–2016), American transgender actress and musician, of the Arquette acting family
 Alexis Simon Belle (1674–1734), French portrait artist
 Alexis Bledel (born 1981), American actress
 Alexis Christoforous (born 1970), American WCBS-TV Wall Street reporter
 Alexis Damianos (1921-2006), Greek, film/theatre and television director
 Alexis Denisof (born 1966), American actor
 Alexis de Tocqueville (1805–1859), French political thinker and historian
 Alexis Dziena (born 1984), American actress
 Alexis Falekas (born 1976), Greek basketball player and coach
 Alexis Galanos (1940–2019), Cypriot politician
 Alexis Gavrilopoulos (born 1981), Greek footballer
 Alexis Georgoulis (born 1974), Greek actor and politician
 Alexis Giraud-Teulon (1839–1916), French academic, lawyer and translator
 Alexis Gizaro Muvuni, DR Congo politician
 Alexis Hornbuckle (born 1985), American professional basketball player
 Alexis Izard (born 1992), French politician
 Alexis Jordan (born 1992), American singer
 Alexis Jordan (swimmer) (born 1988), Barbadian swimmer
 Alexis Kaufman (born 1991), birth name of American professional wrestler Alexa Bliss
 Alexis Kochan (born 1953), Ukrainian-Canadian musician and composer
 Alexis Korner (1928–1984), British blues musician
 Alexis Kyritsis (born 1982), Greek basketball player
 Alexis Lafrenière (born 2001), Canadian ice hockey player
 Alexis Laree (born 1979), stage name of wrestler and country singer Mickie James
 Alexis Lewis, American inventor
 Alexis Loizidis (born 1985), Greek footballer
 Alexis Louder, American actress
 Alexis Lykiard (born 1940), British writer of Greek heritage
 Alexis Marshall, musician from Providence, Rhode Island, the vocalist for Daughters
 Alexis Mac Allister (born 1998), Argentinian football player
 Alexis Mateo (born 1979), Puerto Rican drag queen
 Alexis Matias (born 1974), Puerto Rican volleyball player
 Alexis Méndez (born 1969), Venezuelan track and road cyclist
 Alexis Michelle (born 1984), American drag queen
 Alexis Minatoya (born 1988), Japanese-Belgian basketball player
 Alexis Minotis (1900–1990), Greek theater actor and director
 Alexis Murphy, American murder victim
 Alexis Navalny (Alexei) (born 1976), Russian opposition leader
 Alexis Ohanian (born 1983), American internet entrepreneur and investor
 Alexis Panselinos (born 1943), Greek novelist and translator
 Alexis Papahelas (born 1961), Greek investigative journalist and newspaper editor
 Alexis Pinturault, French alpine skier and Olympic medalist
 Alexis Ríos (born 1981), Puerto Rican baseball player
 Alexis Rojas (born 1972), Colombian road cyclist
 Alexis Rojas (footballer) (born 1996), Paraguayan footballer
 Alexei Romanov (disambiguation), various members of the Romanov family
 Alexis Ruano Delgado (born 1985), Spanish footballer
 Alexis Rykov (1891–1938), Leader of the Soviet Union from 1924 to 1930
 Alexis Sánchez (born 1988), Chilean footballer
 Alexis Sánchez (athlete) (born 1971), Spanish athlete
 Alexis Skye (born 1974), American model
 Alexis Smith (1921–1993), Canadian-born American actress
 Alexis Smith (born 1949), American artist
 Alexis Spyridonidis (born 1995), Greek basketball player
 Alexis Stamatis (born 1960), Greek novelist, playwright and poet
 Alexis Stenvall (1834–1872), Finnish author
 Alexis Suárez Martín (born 1974), Spanish footballer
 Alexis Texas (born 1985), American porn actress
 Alexis Tipton (born 1989), American voice actress
 Alexis Tsipras (born 1974), Greek politician
 Alexis Valido (born 1976), Spanish volleyball player

Fictional characters 
 Alexis Colby, played by Joan Collins on the 1980s prime time soap opera Dynasty
 Alexis Kerib, in the anime series SSSS.Gridman
 Alexis Meade, played by Rebecca Romijn on the American television series Ugly Betty
 Alexis Castle, played by Molly Quinn on the American crime drama television series Castle
 Alexis Leonides, a Greek writer who features in Geoffrey Trease's novels The Hills of Varna and The Crown of Violet
 Alexis Rhodes, a main character in the anime series Yu-Gi-Oh! GX, voiced by Priscilla Everett and Emlyn Morinelli McFarland
 Alexis Thi Dang, in the Transformers Unicron Trilogy, voiced by Tabitha St. Germain
 Alexis Zorbas, the protagonist of Zorba the Greek
 Alexis Rose, played by Annie Murphy on the Canadian sitcom Schitt's Creek

See also 
 Alexis (disambiguation), which includes people known by the mononym Alexis and people with the surname Alexis
 Aleksej
 Alexey

Notes

References 
 Lansky, Bruce (2008). 5-Star Baby Name Advisor. Meadowbrook Press. 

Given names of Greek language origin
English feminine given names
English unisex given names
English-language unisex given names
Greek masculine given names
French masculine given names
fr:Alexis